The Parasuram Express is an express train run by Indian Railways connecting Mangalore, Karnataka with Nagercoil, Tamil Nadu.

History
The train (Train No: 49/50) was initially  run between Cochin and Shoranur. The train was later extended to Trivandrum and Mangalore Central on both sides. In 2012 the train was again extended to Nagarcoil.

Schedule & Timing
The train no.16650 starts from Nagarcoil at 04:15 AM and reaches Mangalore Central at 21:00 PM. In the return direction the train no: 16649 leaves Mangalore Central at 05:05 AM  and reaches Nagarcoil at 21:25 PM. The train runs via Shoranur–Kottayam route.

References

Transport in Mangalore
Transport in Nagercoil
Named passenger trains of India
Rail transport in Karnataka
Rail transport in Kerala
Rail transport in Tamil Nadu
Rail transport in Puducherry
Express trains in India